Thule has been the name of at least two ships of the Swedish Navy:

, was a Swedish coastal defence ship that was launched on 4 March 1893.
, was a Swedish icebreaker launched in 1951 and deleted from records in 1998.

References

Swedish Navy ship names